Barychaeta is a genus of parasitic flies in the family Tachinidae. There is one described species in Barychaeta, B. jaroschewskyi.

References

Further reading

 
 
 
 

Tachinidae
Articles created by Qbugbot